Monte Milone or Montemilone may refer to:
 Montemilone a town (municipality), in the Basilicata region of south Italy
 Monte Milone, a mount near Tolentino, in the Marche region of central Italy
 Monte Milone (meteorite), a meteorite fallen in 1846 near Tolentino in the central Italy